Church of Saints Peter and Paul Complex, now known as the Coptic Monastery of Saint Shenouda, is a historic Roman Catholic church complex located on the edge of the Susan B. Anthony neighborhood of Rochester, Monroe County, New York.  The complex consists of the Italian Renaissance Revival style church (1911), former school (1912), rectory (1926), and rectory garage (1926). The church features a loggia and 145 feet tall bell tower. The school has been converted to 12 apartments. The church was sold to the Coptic Monastery of Saint Shenouda in 2007.

The complex was listed on the National Register of Historic Places in 2012.

References

Churches on the National Register of Historic Places in New York (state)
Renaissance Revival architecture in New York (state)
Roman Catholic churches completed in 1911
20th-century Roman Catholic church buildings in the United States
Roman Catholic churches in Rochester, New York
National Register of Historic Places in Rochester, New York